The  is a type of monorail train operated on the Osaka Monorail since 1989. The trains were built by Hitachi, Ltd. and Kawasaki Heavy Industries, have aluminium bodies, and operate as four-car formations.

Build details

External links
 (Kawasaki Heavy Industries) 

Electric multiple units of Japan
Alweg people movers rolling stock
Train-related introductions in 1989

Hitachi multiple units
1500 V DC multiple units of Japan
Kawasaki multiple units